Prince Waldemar or Valdemar may refer to:

Anhalt-Köthen (German principality)
 Waldemar I, Prince of Anhalt-Zerbst (d. 1368)
 Waldemar II, Prince of Anhalt-Zerbst (d. 1371)
 Waldemar III, Prince of Anhalt-Zerbst (d. 1391)
 Waldemar V, Prince of Anhalt-Köthen, (d. 1436)
 Waldemar VI, Prince of Anhalt-Köthen, (1450–1508)

Other places
 Waldemar IV, Prince of Anhalt-Dessau (d. after 22 July 1417)
 Valdemar of Denmark (disambiguation), several people 
 Prince Waldemar of Prussia (disambiguation), several people 
 Valdemar, King of Sweden (1239–1302)
 Valdemar, Duke of Finland (c. 1282 – 1318)
 Waldemar, Margrave of Brandenburg-Stendal or Waldemar the Great (c. 1280 – 1319)
 Woldemar, Prince of Lippe (1824–1895)